A pineapple cutter is a hand-held cylindrical kitchen utensil with a circular blade at the end designed for cutting pineapples. A knife is required to open the top of the pineapple before using the pineapple cutter. The cutter will cut the flesh of the pineapple into a spiral and also removes the core. Different sizes are available so as not to cut into the skin of the pineapple or cause too much to be wasted. 

A simpler version known as a pineapple corer removes only the core of the pineapple. These appear identical to the pineapple cutter but do not include the cutting blade.

See also
 Apple corer

References

External links 

Pineapples
Domestic implements